In Japan, a  is required when operating a car, motorcycle or moped on public roads. Driving licenses are issued by the prefectural governments' public safety commissions and are overseen on a nationwide basis by the National Police Agency.

Types of license 
Japanese licenses are divided by experience level and by vehicle type.

Classes

Categories
The vehicle classes are as follows:

The "restricted to automatic" license can be issued for ordinary vehicle (including Class 2 license), ordinary motorcycle and heavy motorcycle license classes. 
The "restricted to small motorcycle" license ( 1.0Kw/125cc or less) can be issued for ordinary motorcycle license class, and can be issued along with the "restricted to automatic" license.

Vehicle Type Ratings
The vehicle type ratings are as follows:

The minimum requirement for heavy or medium vehicle license can be relaxed to 19 years old and one year experience under ordinary vehicle/heavy special vehicle license by certain lesson in driving school.

Required training
There are two options for learners. Firstly, learners can attend a designated driving school. Graduates from a designated driving school do not need to sit the practical examination but they do need to sit the written examination. Secondly, learners can attend non-designated driving school or obtain practice through other means, in which case they must sit both the practical and written examinations. The Japanese driving examination consists of a written examination and a practical examination for each level of license. Most Japanese go to a driving school prior to taking these examinations (though it is not required), and upon completing the course at a non-designated driving school must register for the examinations in the prefecture where they are registered as a resident. The practical examination consists of driving a vehicle through a purpose-designed driving course while obeying relevant rules of the road.

Japan also allows Japan-resident holders of foreign driving licenses to convert their foreign license to a Japanese license through an abbreviated examination process. This consists of an eyesight test and, depending on the issuing country of the foreign license, may also require a short written examination and a practical examination.

Countries exempt from the exam include, as of 2022: Iceland, Ireland, parts of the United States (limited to only the states of Ohio, Virginia, Hawaii, Maryland and Washington), United Kingdom, Italy, Australia, Austria, Netherlands, Canada, South Korea, Greece, Switzerland, Sweden, Spain, Slovenia, Czech Republic, Denmark, Germany, New Zealand, Norway, Hungary, Finland, France, Belgium, Poland, Portugal, Monaco, Luxembourg, and Taiwan.

In 2003, the first-time pass rate for Americans was slightly higher than the 35 percent pass rate for Japanese returnees, but not much. On the other hand, for those who took the regular test, they had to go through an intensive (and expensive) driver education program. The first time pass rate for this group, even with the harder test, was 90 to 100 percent. As of 2022, the fee for an English-speaking foreigner to obtain a license from a Japanese driving school is about ¥500,000 (or about US$).

Driving license card

Layout of a driving license card

Description
The sections of the sample license shown are:

Date format
The dates are written in year-month-day order. The years follow the Japanese era calendar scheme. The months and days follow the Gregorian calendar, as in most Western countries.

For example:
 the driver's date of birth (昭和５０年６月１日) is the 1st day (１日) of the 6th month (６月) of the 50th year (５０年) of the reign of Emperor Shōwa (昭和), or 1 June 1975
 the expiry date (平成２４年０７月０１日) is the 1st day (０１日) of the 7th month (０７月) of the 24th year (２４年) of the reign of Emperor Heisei (平成), or 1 July 2012

Categories of license
Abbreviated names of the categories of vehicle this license includes. For illustrative purposes, this sample license shows every category. Category names are in the same places on every license. If a category is not included in a license, in the place where the category name would appear there is a horizontal bar.

Amendments
Amendments to the license, such as a change of address, can be recorded on the reverse side of the license. For amendments that cannot be recorded in this manner, a new license must be issued.

Use in other countries
Great Britain has an exchange agreement with Japan (and with 16 other countries/regions) which allows the holder of a Japanese license who is deemed to be resident in the UK to exchange it for a British license. To do this, the holder must send the license, a translation thereof, an application form and a fee to the DVLA or DVA (for Northern Ireland).

See also
Driver's license

References

Japan
Road transport in Japan